"Hummingbird" is a song recorded by the American country music artist Ricky Skaggs. It was released in April 1990 as the fourth single from the album Kentucky Thunder and reached #20 on the Billboard Hot Country Singles & Tracks chart.

Other versions
The song was originally recorded by Restless Heart, whose guitarist Greg Jennings co-wrote it with Tim DuBois, on their 1986 album Wheels. Their version was the B-side to the album's single "Why Does It Have to Be (Wrong or Right)".

Chart performance

References

1990 singles
Restless Heart songs
Ricky Skaggs songs
Songs written by Tim DuBois
Song recordings produced by Steve Buckingham (record producer)
Song recordings produced by Ricky Skaggs
Epic Records singles
1986 songs